Pendroma is a genus of sea snails, marine gastropod mollusks in the family Pendromidae.

Species
Species within the genus Pendroma include:
 Pendroma perplexa Dall, 1927

References

External links
 To World Register of Marine Species

Pendromidae
Monotypic gastropod genera